Recoverin (abbreviated Recov) is a 23 kilodalton (kDa) neuronal calcium-binding protein that is primarily detected in the photoreceptor cells of the eye. It plays a key role in the inhibition of rhodopsin kinase, a molecule which regulates the phosphorylation of rhodopsin. A reduction in this inhibition helps regulate sensory adaptation in the retina, since the light-dependent channel closure in photoreceptors causes calcium levels to decrease, which relieves the inhibition of rhodopsin kinase by calcium-bound recoverin, leading to a more rapid inactivation of metarhodopsin II (activated form of rhodopsin).

Structure & Function 
Recoverin is involved in the recovery phase of visual excitation and in adaptation to background light. It controls the life span of photoexcited rhodopsin by helping to inhibit rhodopsin kinase. An image of bovine recoverin with 3.00 Å resolution is shown. This three-dimensional structure was determined by X-ray diffraction. Covalently attached at the amino-terminal of recoverin is a  myristoyl group. When the protein binds calcium ions, it undergoes a conformational change and brings out the myristoyl group from the binding portion so that the group is able to either interact with the target or the protein can move to a different region. When recoverin is not bound to calcium, it stays in cytosol. When recoverin binds calcium, it migrates to the disc membrane and is embedded into the membrane using the myristoyl group to anchor itself. This calcium-bound form of recoverin slows the activity of rhodopsin kinase, resulting in the prolongation of light sensitivity for rhodopsin. Recent publications point out additional functions for recoverin. For instance, it goes through a light-dependent intracellular translocation to rod synaptic terminals and improves the signal transfer between rods and rod bipolar cells in the retina of mice.

In humans, the recoverin protein is encoded by the RCVRN gene.

References

External links
 

EF-hand-containing proteins